The women's road race H5 cycling event at the 2016 Summer Paralympics took place on September 15 at Pontal, Rio.

Results : Women's road race H5

References

Women's road race H5